Son of God's Country is a 1948 American Western film directed by R. G. Springsteen and written by Paul Gangelin and Robert Creighton Williams. The film stars Monte Hale, Pamela Blake, Paul Hurst, James Nolan, Jay Kirby and Steve Darrell. The film was released on September 15, 1948, by Republic Pictures.

Plot

Cast   
Monte Hale as U.S. Marshal Monte Hale
Pamela Blake as Cathy Thornton
Paul Hurst as Eli Walker
James Nolan as Bill Sanger 
Jay Kirby as Frank Thornton
Steve Darrell as Henchman Bigelow
Francis McDonald as Tom Ford
Jason Robards, Sr. as John Thornton 
Fred Graham as Henchman Hagen

References

External links 
 

1948 films
American Western (genre) films
1948 Western (genre) films
Republic Pictures films
Films directed by R. G. Springsteen
American black-and-white films
1940s English-language films
1940s American films